The Städtisches Kaufhaus in Leipzig, designed by Rayher, Korber and Müller, was constructed from 1894 to 1901.

Site history prior to Städtisches Kaufhaus 

This piece of land and architectural monument reflects 500 years of Leipzig's inner city's history of trading and culture. In the years 1477 to 1498 the first Gewandhaus (garb-house) was constructed there at the so-called Gewandgäßchen and Universitätsstraße. Due to the imperial fair privilege from 1497 Leipzig quickly became very important as an emporium. The Gewandhaus was home to foreign cloth merchants and also hosted the Zeughaus (armory).

After nearly 250 years of utilisation the first Gewandhaus was torn down and from 1740 to 1744 replaced by the municipal library, which was erected in baroque manner and again hosted an armory (in its east wing). Many parts can still be recognised in today's building. In 1780/1781 the armory was reconstructed into a concert hall, which was the first permanent home the Gewandhaus orchestra (presumably Germany's oldest civil orchestra). The hall was designed by Johann Carl Friedrich Dauthe. It saw numerous famous concerts e. g. by Mendelssohn Bartholdy, Mozart and Liszt. Even though the hall's capacity was extended a couple of times, in the long run it was too small, so the Gewandhaus orchestra in 1884 moved to the newly built Neues Concerthaus (new concert house), which was home to the orchestra until 1943, when it was destroyed by bombs. After an interim in the congress hall the Gewandhaus orchestra's permanent home today is the (third) Gewandhaus, located at the Augustusplatz.

History of the Städtisches Kaufhaus 

As the Leipzig trade fair in the course of the industrial revolution changed its focus, in 1893 some storeys of the municipal library where reconstructed to serve as sample fair booths. This concept immediately proved successful, so all other buildings on the site were torn down in 1894. The Städtisches Kaufhaus was then constructed from 1894 to 1901 in three construction stages. The building was the prototype of a specialised sample fair building -  a building type very common in Leipzig's inner city. Unlike the other sample fair buildings (or fair palaces. as they were called) the Städtisches Kaufhaus assimilates the baroque manner of the municipal library, which was integrated.

In 1943 the building complex was severely damaged respectively partly destroyed by aerial bombing. Part of the Städtisches Kaufhaus was reconstructed after World War II during GDR times, but the northern parts remained a ruin until the 1980s.

After German reunification the building was completely reconstructed from 1993 to 1996 with particular attention to monument protection. As Leipzig's Trade Fair Site was newly constructed near the airport, the Städtisches Kaufhaus nowadays is home to office (some 13,000 m² rental office space), retail outlets and restaurants (some 7,000 m² rental non-office space). In this sense the name 'municipal store' is even more misleading as it has ever been. The origin of the name is not known. In addition to reconstruction an underground parking garage and an underground event location have been built-in.

Touristic attractions are the statue of emperor Maximilian at the Universitätsstraße, the baroque stairway (with memorial badge at the former entrance to the Gewandhaus orchestra hall), Leipzig's oldest conserved elevator and the 'Straße der Stars', a walk of fame-like exhibition of hand imprints of prominent people (e. g. Mariah Carey, Max Schmeling, Hans Dietrich Genscher) in the courtyard.

External links 
Straße der Stars
Pre-First World War Concert Programmes from the Städtisches Kaufhaus

Buildings and structures in Leipzig
Tourist attractions in Leipzig